Luciobrotula bartschi is a species of fish in the family Ophidiidae.

References 

Ophidiidae
Animals described in 1913